Pansing is a subsidiary company of Times Publishing Group, the printing and publishing subsidiary of Singapore-based conglomerate Fraser and Neave and at present is a distributor of books, magazines and related media in the Asia-Pacific region.

External links
Corporate website
Pansing Books
Pansing Magazine

Book publishing companies of Singapore
Publishing companies established in 1975
1975 establishments in Singapore